Stud may refer to the following terms:

Animals
 Stud (animal), an animal retained for breeding
 Stud farm, a property where livestock are bred

Arts and entertainment
 Stud (band), a British progressive rock group
 The Stud (bar), a gay bar in San Francisco
 The Stud (film), a 1978 film starring Joan Collins and Oliver Tobias
 The Stud (novel), by Jackie Collins
 Studs (game show), a dating show from the early 1990s
 Stud poker, a card game with numerous variations, including:
 Five-card stud
 Seven-card stud
 Caribbean stud poker
 Studs (film), a 2006 Irish film by Paul Mercier
 Studs McGirdle, a character in Cars (film)

Other uses
 Cleat (shoe), a protrusion on the sole of a shoe worn for playing sports
 Shirt stud, a decorative fastener
 Threaded rod, a kind of bolt
 Wall stud, a vertical member in construction
 Small metal pins on snow tires to increase traction
 A term for a promiscuous male
 Stud., an abbreviation for student

See also
 Stud contact system, a power supply system for tramways
 Stud welding, a form of spot welding